"God's Gonna Get'cha for That" is a song by country music singers George Jones and Tammy Wynette. Released in the spring of 1975, the song was the second of two chart singles from their 1974 duet album George & Tammy & Tina.

The song reached number 25 on the U.S. Hot Country Singles chart.  It describes God's awareness and inevitable judgment of the sins of all people, particularly hypocrisy and hidden sins among professed people of faith, including ministers.

Charts

References

1974 songs
1975 singles
George Jones songs
Tammy Wynette songs
Song recordings produced by Billy Sherrill
Epic Records singles
Male–female vocal duets